The Milwaukee Brewers' 1986 season involved the Brewers' finishing 6th in the American League East with a record of 77 wins and 84 losses.

Offseason
 November 14, 1985: Rick Waits was released by the Brewers.
 November 25, 1985: Pete Ladd was released by the Brewers.
 December 11, 1985: Ed Romero was traded by the Brewers to the Boston Red Sox for Mark Clear.
 December 18, 1985: Dean Freeland (minors) and Eric Pilkington (minors) were traded by the Brewers to the San Francisco Giants for Rob Deer.
 December 22, 1985: Danny Darwin was signed as a free agent with the Brewers.
 March 5, 1986: Ted Simmons was traded by the Brewers to the Atlanta Braves for Rick Cerone, David Clay (minors), and Flavio Alfaro (minors).
 March 26, 1986: Rob DeWolf (minors) was traded by the Brewers to the San Francisco Giants for Steve Stanicek.
 March 30, 1986: Moose Haas was traded by the Brewers to the Oakland Athletics for Charlie O'Brien, Steve Kiefer, Mike Fulmer (minors), and Pete Kendrick (minors).

Regular season
Teddy Higuera would win 20 games in 1986 and would be the last 20 game winner in the 20th century for the Brewers.

Season standings

Record vs. opponents

Notable transactions
 April 1, 1986: Ray Burris was released by the Brewers.
 August 15, 1986: Danny Darwin was traded by the Brewers to the Houston Astros for Don August and Mark Knudson.

Draft picks
 June 2, 1986: 1986 Major League Baseball draft
Gary Sheffield was drafted by the Brewers in the 1st round (6th pick). Player signed June 26, 1986.
Tim McIntosh was drafted by the Brewers in the 3rd round.

Roster

Player stats

Batting

Starters by position
Note: Pos = Position; G = Games played; AB = At bats; H = Hits; Avg. = Batting average; HR = Home runs; RBI = Runs batted in

Other batters
Note: G = Games played; AB = At bats; H = Hits; Avg. = Batting average; HR = Home runs; RBI = Runs batted in

Pitching

Starting pitchers 
Note: G = Games pitched; IP = Innings pitched; W = Wins; L = Losses; ERA = Earned run average; SO = Strikeouts

Other pitchers 
Note: G = Games pitched; IP = Innings pitched; W = Wins; L = Losses; ERA = Earned run average; SO = Strikeouts

Relief pitchers 
Note: G = Games pitched; W = Wins; L = Losses; SV = Saves; ERA = Earned run average; SO = Strikeouts

Farm system

The Brewers' farm system consisted of five minor league affiliates in 1986. The El Paso Diablos won the Texas League championship, and the Stockton Ports won the California League championship.

References

1986 Milwaukee Brewers team at Baseball-Reference
1986 Milwaukee Brewers team page at www.baseball-almanac.com

Milwaukee Brewers seasons
Milwaukee Brewers season
Mil